France competed at the 2018 Winter Olympics in Pyeongchang, South Korea, from 9 to 25 February 2018, with 106 competitors in 11 sports. They won 15 medals in total, five gold, four silver and six bronze, ranking 9th in the medal table.

Biathlete Martin Fourcade was the country's flag bearer during the opening ceremony, and its most successful athlete with three gold medals. Biathletes Anais Bescond and Marie Dorin-Habert, alpine skier Alexis Pinturault and ski racer Maurice Manificat also won multiple medals on the games.

Medalists

| width="78%" align="left" valign="top" |

| width="22%" align="left" valign="top" |

Competitors
The following is the list of number of competitors participating at the Games per sport/discipline.

The list of competitors:

Alpine skiing 

Men

Women

Mixed

Biathlon 

Based on their Nations Cup rankings in the 2016–17 Biathlon World Cup, France has qualified a full team of 6 men and 6 women.

Men

Women

Mixed

Bobsleigh 

Based on their rankings in the 2017–18 Bobsleigh World Cup, France has qualified 2 sleds.

* – Denotes the driver of each sled

Cross-country skiing 

Distance
Men

Women

Sprint

Figure skating 

France qualified eight figure skates (four men and four female), based on its placement at the 2017 World Figure Skating Championships in Helsinki, Finland. They announced part of their team on December 18 2017.

Team event

Freestyle skiing 

Halfpipe

Moguls

Ski cross

Qualification legend: FA – Qualify to medal round; FB – Qualify to consolation round

Slopestyle

Nordic combined

Short track speed skating

According to the ISU Special Olympic Qualification Rankings, France has qualified 2 men and 2 women each.

Qualification legend: ADV – Advanced due to being impeded by another skater; FA – Qualify to medal round; FB – Qualify to consolation round

Ski jumping

Snowboarding 

Freestyle

Parallel

Snowboard cross

Qualification legend: FA – Qualify to medal round; FB – Qualify to consolation round

Speed skating 

France qualified one speed skater.

Individual

Mass start

References

Nations at the 2018 Winter Olympics
2018
Winter Olympics